Bracora is a settlement in Lochaber in the Highlands of Scotland. It lies on the north shore of Loch Morar.

Populated places in Lochaber